Harrison, West Virginia may refer to:
Harrison, Clay County, West Virginia, an unincorporated community in Clay County
Harrison, Mineral County, West Virginia, an unincorporated community in Mineral County

See also
 Harrison County, West Virginia